The 2007 Swindon Borough Council election took place on 4 May 2007 to elect members of Swindon Unitary Council in Wiltshire, England. One third of the council was up for election and the Conservative Party stayed in overall control of the council.

After the election, the composition of the council was
Conservative 43
Labour 13
Liberal Democrat 3

Campaign
92 candidates were contesting 21 seats with 2 seats available in Haydon Wick wards. Both Conservative and Labour parties contested every seat, while the Liberal Democrats had 20 candidates. Other political parties contesting the election included the Green Party with 16 candidates, United Kingdom Independence Party with 7 and the British National Party with 3.

Issues in the election included regeneration of the town, affordable housing, crime and preserving green space. The Conservative council's plans to move to fortnightly rubbish collection were also criticised by the Labour party.

For the election voters were able to cast their vote at any polling station or library instead of just their polling station, as well as internet and text voting being available. The vote count was also done electronically, however problems at a few polling stations meant some votes had to be checked manually. This meant the election count was 2 hours later than expected, with overall turnout in the election being 33.8%.

Election result
The results saw the Conservatives stay in control of the council with 43 seats, compared to 13 for Labour and 3 Liberal Democrats. Both the Conservative and Labour parties made 2 gains, with each party taking 1 seat from the other. The Conservatives gained Moredon from Labour, while Labour took a seat back in Central ward. Both parties also gained a seat from an independent, with the Conservatives taking Freshbrook and Grange Park, while Labour took Penhill. Elsewhere Conservative candidates held on by small majorities of 36 and 45 over Labour in St Philip and Walcot wards respectively.

Ward results

References

2007 English local elections
2007
2000s in Wiltshire